Whitley, the professional name of Lawrence Greenwood, is an Australian Singer and songwriter. 

Whitley's album, Go Forth, Find Mammoth, was nominated for the ARIA Award for Best Adult Alternative Album.

In 2017, P.S. I'm Haunted was released under the name Lawrence Greenwood.

Discography

Studio albums

Awards and nominations

ARIA Music Awards
The ARIA Music Awards is an annual awards ceremony that recognises excellence, innovation, and achievement across all genres of Australian music. They commenced in 1987.

! 
|-
|2010
| Go Forth, Find Mammoth
| ARIA Award for Best Adult Alternative Album
| 
|
|-

References

Australian male singers
Living people
Year of birth missing (living people)